Sushmita Sen (born 19 November 1975) is an Indian actress, model and the winner of the Miss Universe 1994 pageant. She is the first Indian to win the Miss Universe pageant. She was previously crowned Femina Miss India 1994 at the age of 18. After winning the Miss Universe pageant, she has worked as a film actress.

Sen won the Filmfare Award for Best Supporting Actress for her performance in the comedy film Biwi No.1 (1999), and was also nominated in the category for her roles in the dramas Sirf Tum (1999) and Filhaal... (2002). Her commercially successful films include Aankhen (2002), Main Hoon Na (2004), and Maine Pyaar Kyun Kiya? (2005). Sen has starred in the drama series Aarya since 2020, for which she won Best Actress at the Filmfare OTT Awards.

Early life
Sen was born into a Bengali Baidya family in Hyderabad to Shubeer Sen, a former Indian Air Force Wing Commander, and Subhra Sen, a jewellery designer and owner of a Dubai-based store. She has one sibling. 
 
She attended Air Force Golden Jubilee Institute in New Delhi and St. Ann's High School in Secunderabad, but did not pursue any further higher education.

Pageantry

Femina Miss India
In 1994, as a teenager, Sen won the title 'Femina Miss India Universe', earning the right to compete at the Miss Universe 1994 contest.

Miss Universe 1994
At the Miss Universe contest, Sen ranked third overall in the preliminaries, behind Miss Colombia Carolina Gómez and Miss Venezuela Minorka Mercado. Sen went on to place second, fifth and third in the subsequent rounds and finally won the title and crown of Miss Universe 1994.

After the Times Group relinquished the rights to choose the Indian representative to Miss Universe, Sen's project, I Am She – Miss Universe India, took over, running it for three years (2010 to 2012). This was followed by Femina taking over.

Miss Universe judge 2016
in January 2017 appeared as one of the judges of Miss Universe 2016 at the Mall of Asia Arena, Pasay, Metro Manila, Philippines on 30 January 2017. Joining her as judges were Cynthia Bailey, Mickey Boardman, Francine LaFrak, Miss Universe 2011 Leila Lopes, and Miss Universe 1993 Dayanara Torres.

Acting career

1990s

After her reign as Miss Universe, Sen became an actress. Her first film Dastak was in 1996, in which she played the victim of a stalker, played by Sharad Kapoor. Mukul Dev starred as the lead actor. She then starred in the 1997 Tamil action film Ratchagan. Two years later, her appearance as Rupali in David Dhawan's comedy film Biwi No.1 won her the Filmfare Award for Best Supporting Actress in 1999. Biwi No.1 was the second highest-grossing movie of 1999. The same year, she was also nominated for her role in the drama Sirf Tum in the same category. In 2000, she appeared in a dance song in the film Fiza.

2000s
She received critical acclaim and box office success for the film Aankhen, starring opposite Arjun Rampal. The film co-starred Amitabh Bachchan, Akshay Kumar, Aditya Pancholi and Paresh Rawal. The biggest success of her career came with the 2004 action film Main Hoon Na, in which she played the role of a chemistry teacher who falls in love with Shah Rukh Khan's character. The film grossed a total of  330,000,000 and was the second highest-grossing film of that year. Later, Sushmita played a lawyer in Main Aisa Hi Hoon opposite Ajay Devgan. In 2005, she also starred in a remake of Cactus Flower, called Maine Pyaar Kyun Kiya?. Sen played the lead, opposite Salman Khan and Katrina Kaif. She also played the leading role in Karma Aur Holi.

2010s

In 2010, Sushmita played the role of a successful supermodel called Shimmer in Dulha Mil Gaya; the film was a moderate success that year. She additionally appeared in the action-comedy film No Problem the same year. In 2015, she starred in a Bengali drama film titled Nirbaak. In Sen's career, this was her first film in Bengali language.

2020s

In 2020 Sen appeared in Disney Hotstar's TV Series Aarya, where she won the 2021 Critic's Choice Award. She returned for the second season released in December 2021.

Personal life

Sen has two adopted children. Sen has Addison's disease and requires lifelong steroid drugs to manage the illness. Sen and Rohman Shawl were in a relationship from 2018 until 2021. 

In July 2022, it was reported that she is dating businessman and cricket administrator Lalit Modi.

Filmography

Awards and nominations

References

External links

 
 

1975 births
20th-century Indian actresses
21st-century Indian actresses
Actresses from Hyderabad, India
Actresses in Bengali cinema
Actresses in Hindi cinema
Actresses in Tamil cinema
Bengali people
Femina Miss India winners
Indian beauty pageant winners
Indian film actresses
Living people
Miss Universe 1994 contestants
Miss Universe winners
Mithibai College alumni
Female models from Hyderabad, India
Filmfare Awards winners
Screen Awards winners
International Indian Film Academy Awards winners
Zee Cine Awards winners